Nevşehir Castle is a historic castle in the city of Nevşehir, overlooking the recently discovered underground city of Kayaşehir. It was a fortress for defensive, military purposes.

History
Not much is known about Nevşehir Castle, it is theorized to have been built by the Seljuks around 1100, though it also theorized to have been built by the Byzantines as a military outpost.

References
 
 
 Nevşehir Kayaşehir Castle

External links

 Nevşehir Castle
 Information on the castle and underground city
 

Castles in Turkey
Nevşehir
History of Turkey